Jit Sin Independent High School (日新独立中学), a member of Jit Sin, is a Chinese independent high school located in Bukit Mertajam, Penang, Malaysia. It provides various education levels from junior 1 to 3, senior 1 to 3. The school also offers Unified Examination Certificate (UEC) for both junior and senior students and optional choice of Penilaian Menengah Rendah for juniors and Sijil Pelajaran Malaysia for seniors.

Recognition
The school was bestowed " 5 stars private education " by Ministry of Education (Malaysia) on 22 July 2013.

Floral emblem
The Floral emblem of Jit Sin (Independent) High School is  Cassia fistula also known as the Golden Shower Tree. It was officially announced by the principal on 9 November 2013.

See also
 Bukit Mertajam

References

External links
Jit Sin Independent High School 6 years plan

Schools in Penang
Secondary schools in Malaysia
Chinese-language schools in Malaysia